Olkhovoye is a rural locality (a selo) and the administrative centre of Olkhovsky Selsoviet, Ufimsky District, Bashkortostan, Russia. The population was 889 as of 2010. There are 15 streets.

Geography 
Olkhovoye is located 29 km south of Ufa (the district's administrative centre) by road. Starye Kiyeshki is the nearest rural locality.

References 

Rural localities in Ufimsky District